Pitfall 3D: Beyond the Jungle (Pitfall 3D in Japan and Pitfall: Beyond the Jungle in Europe) is a platform game developed by Activision's internal Console Development Group and published by Activision in 1998 for the PlayStation and by Crave Entertainment in 1999 for the Game Boy Color, where it is called Pitfall: Beyond the Jungle in the Americas and Europe, and Pitfall GB in Japan.

Gameplay

Just as in its predecessor Pitfall: The Mayan Adventure, the original Pitfall! for the Atari 2600 is available as an Easter Egg. Unlike The Mayan Adventure, however, the game is set in a 3D environment which allows the player character to move in any direction. The player character also has a much wider range of attacks, some of which must be acquired through item pick-ups.

Plot

In this adventure, Pitfall Harry Jr meets a girl named Mira who enlists his aid in freeing her people from "The Scourge", an evil woman bent on controlling the world.

Development
The developers decided to set the game in a magical parallel universe because there were no genuinely unexplored lands in the real world, and because it provided a story explanation for gameplay elements such as morphing creatures and floating platforms. Director Tony Grant explained the team's approach to level design: "If you think about Crash Bandicoot, it was extremely linear, and we don't like that. Mario 64 was really open, but the structure we've chosen is somewhere in the middle. We have definite paths, but they're not as limited as those in Crash. They branch a lot, but we wanted to make sure the player always has a sense of where to go."

The game's characters, creatures, and terrain were all modeled from concept sketches by comic book artist Christian Gossett. Gossett stated during development that coming up with designs that would be clear and not confusing in the game's environment was a challenge, since 3D gaming was a relatively new medium which he and the rest of the team were still learning how to work with. Two key members of the development team had a background in the Virtua Fighter series; lead programmer Franscois-Yves Bertrand developed the camera and collision system for Virtua Fighter and Virtua Fighter 2, and lead modeler/animator Jeff Buchanan worked on the models and animations for Virtua Fighter.

Pitfall Harry Jr. was voiced by Bruce Campbell. The developers, who were fans of the Evil Dead films which Campbell was most famous for starring in, included a number of lines referencing the films in the script, but Campbell objected that he was fed up with making Evil Dead references.

The game was demonstrated at the September 1996 European Computer Trade Show. Electronic Gaming Monthly said it was "one of the biggest surprises of the show" and "one of the games that'll really test the PlayStation and push its hardware to the limit." The release date was originally set for the second quarter of 1997, but slipped to the fourth quarter, and was pushed back again to March 1998. Causes for the delays included heavy personnel changes which occurred in early 1997.

Reception

Next Generation reviewed the PlayStation version of the game, rating it two stars out of five, and stated that "There is some fun here, but the appeal is almost retro - there's nothing in Pitfall 3D that hasn't been seen before."

With six reviews, Pitfall 3D has a GameRankings score of 68% for the PlayStation version.

References

External links
Pitfall 3D: Beyond the Jungle at MobyGames

1998 video games
3D platform games
Game Boy Color games
Game Boy Color-only games
Pitfall (series)
PlayStation (console) games
PlayStation (console)-only games
Video games scored by Mark Cooksey
Video games developed in the United Kingdom
Video games developed in the United States
Video games set in Mexico